Gerold is a given name. Notable people with the name include:

Gerold Bührer (born 1948), Swiss politician and member of the National Council (1991–2007)
Gerold of Cologne (1201–1251), martyr and saint
Gerold Löffler (born 1967), Swiss bobsledder who has competed in the early 1990s
Gerold Schwarzenbach (1904–1978), Swiss chemist
Gerold Späth (born 1939), Swiss poet and writer
Gerold of Vinzgouw  (c. 730 – 784/786 or 795) was a count in Kraichgau and Anglachgau
Gerold, Prefect of Bavaria (died 799), Margrave of the Avarian March and Prefect of Bavaria

See also
Sankt Gerold, municipality in the district of Bludenz in Vorarlberg, Austria